Pinasugbo, also known as consilva, is a Filipino banana chip dessert made from thinly sliced saba bananas that are deep-fried and coated with caramelized sugar and sesame seeds. It originates from the Hiligaynon people of the Western Visayas islands. It is traditionally sold in white paper cones.

See also
 Panocha mani
 Banana cue
 Camote cue
 Maruya
 Turon

References

Banana dishes
Deep fried foods
Philippine desserts
Snack foods
Street food